Wuppertal Wings is a German women's basketball team from Wuppertal. Wings has won Euroleague Women in the 1995–96 season and several German Championships.

Titles
 1 Euroleague Women (1996)
 German Championships (1989, 1993, 1994, 1995, 1996, 1997, 1998, 1999, 2000, 2001, 2002)

Women's basketball teams in Germany
EuroLeague Women clubs
Sport in Wuppertal